Selina Kyle, commonly known as Catwoman, is a fictional character who appears in Tim Burton's Batman film series and is based on the DC Comics character of the same name. She is portrayed by American actress Michelle Pfeiffer. This is often considered to be one of Pfeiffer's finest performances, even though she regarded it as one of her most uncomfortable, due to the sheer discomfort and inhibitions she suffered through while wearing the costume. The character debuted in the 1992 film Batman Returns.

When Batman Returns was released in June 1992, the performance caused a sensation, receiving critical acclaim and numerous accolades, and is consistently referred to as the greatest portrayal of Catwoman of all time by critics and fans.

Character arc 
This version of Selina Kyle is depicted as a long-suffering secretary of corrupt tycoon Max Shreck (Christopher Walken). After Selina accidentally discovers Shreck's plot to build a power plant that would steal Gotham's electricity, Shreck attempts to murder her by pushing her out the window of his office. Selina is knocked unconscious after the fall and is revived by a group of alley cats that flock around her and begin gnawing at her fingers. When she returns home, she suffers a psychotic breakdown and becomes Catwoman.

As part of her larger plan to destroy Shreck, she allies herself with the Penguin (Danny DeVito), which attracts Batman's (Michael Keaton) attention. Meanwhile, she begins a relationship with Bruce Wayne, at first not knowing that he is Batman. At the climax of the film, Catwoman tries to kill Shreck. Although Shreck shoots her several times, he fails to kill her. She then kills Shreck by kissing him with a taser in her mouth while holding onto an exposed power cable. An explosion ensues, but afterwards, Batman finds only Shreck's charred corpse. As the Bat-signal later shines in the night sky, Catwoman is seen watching from afar.

Other media 
In the sequel, Batman Forever, Catwoman is briefly mentioned by Dr. Chase Meridian in a conversation with Batman.

In 2004's Catwoman, Kyle's photograph is shown among those of former "Catwomen" viewed by Patience Phillips (Halle Berry) when visiting researcher Ophelia Powers (Frances Conroy). 

In "Arrowverse" crossover, "Crisis on Infinite Earths, the setting of Batman and Batman Returns is established to take place on "Earth-89". The newspaper article read by an older Alexander Knox (Robert Wuhl) shows that Kyle later became publicly engaged to Bruce Wayne after reuniting with him.

In Birds of Prey (2002–2003) television series opening credits and main plot, Helena Kyle / Huntress (Ashley Scott) is shown to be the daughter of Keaton's Batman and Pfeiffer's Catwoman.

Background 
Pfeiffer's interpretation of the character is specifically influenced by the graphic novel Catwoman: Her Sister's Keeper, and derives heavily from the Pre-Crisis version of the character. In the film, she wears an all-black update of the character's traditionally green catsuit, and her facial appearance includes blonde hair and a cat-eared cowl that covers up part of her face, with the initial concept for the costume coming from Tim Burton, who envisioned a stuffed cat with its stitches coming apart at the seams.

Sam Hamm originally wrote a sequel script to the original Batman, which had Catwoman teaming up with The Penguin to go after hidden treasure, but screenwriter Daniel Waters reworked her characterization after Burton brought him in to pen a new screenplay for the film. Waters explained "Sam Hamm went back to the way comic books in general treat women, like fetishy sexual fantasy. I wanted to start off just at the lowest point in society, a very beaten down secretary." Catwoman killing Schreck with the taser kiss was originally written as her disfiguring Harvey Dent and turning him into Two-Face in early drafts of the script, but he was eventually deleted from the film.

According to Pfeiffer, who was previously reportedly considered to play Vicki Vale in the previous film but turned down, she felt devastated after Annette Bening was cast as Catwoman based on the strength of her performance in The Grifters, but Bening had to drop out of the film due to becoming pregnant. Sean Young, who was originally chosen for Vicki Vale in the previous film, believed the role should have gone to her, and she visited the production offices dressed in a homemade Catwoman costume, demanding to be considered.

Susan Sarandon, Meryl Streep, Brooke Shields, Demi Moore, Nicole Kidman (who ended up playing Dr. Chase Meridian in Batman Forever), Jodie Foster, Geena Davis (who worked before with Burton and Keaton in Beetlejuice), Sigourney Weaver, Lena Olin, singer Madonna, Raquel Welch, Cher, Ellen Barkin, Jennifer Jason Leigh, Lorraine Bracco, Jennifer Beals, and Bridget Fonda also either sought out or were considered for the role. Burton was unfamiliar with Pfeiffer's work when she was suggested to him, but after one meeting was convinced that she would be perfect, and that she "could be both Selina Kyle and Catwoman" at the same time. Pfeiffer undertook kickboxing lessons for the role and trained for months with an expert to master the whip, and on the first day she accidentally cut her teacher's chin. Kathy Long, Pfeiffer's kickboxing coach, also served as her body double on the film.

More than 60 latex catsuits were created for the six-month shoot at $1,000 each. The initial concept for the design came from Tim Burton, who envisioned a stuffed cat with its stitches coming apart at the seams. The costume was created around a body cast of Pfeiffer so that it would fit her exactly, and painted with white silicone rubber to imitate stitches. It was extremely tight and very laborious to put on – Pfeiffer had to be covered in talcum powder to squeeze into the costume, which was in turn brushed with liquid silicone on every take to give it shine. Pfeiffer would wear the suit for 12 to 14 hours at a time, except lunch breaks when it was removed, which was her only opportunity to use the bathroom during the workday.

Reception 

Audiences at test screenings responded positively to Michelle Pfeiffer's performance, and the studio wanted to make it clear Catwoman survived, so two weeks before release the final shot of her was added to the film. Pfeiffer received universal critical acclaim for her performance, and is consistently referred to as the greatest portrayal of Catwoman of all time by critics and fans. Janet Maslin described her performance as "captivating... fierce, seductive", while Peter Travers wrote in Rolling Stone "Pfeiffer gives this feminist avenger a tough core of intelligence and wit; she's a classic dazzler". Premiere retrospectively lauded her performance: "Arguably the outstanding villain of the Tim Burton era, Michelle Pfeiffer's deadly kitten with a whip brought sex to the normally neutered franchise. Her stitched-together, black patent leather costume, based on a sketch of Burton's, remains the character's most iconic look. And Michelle Pfeiffer overcomes Batman Returns' heavy-handed feminist dialogue to deliver a growling, fierce performance."

Todd McCarthy of Variety praised her performance: "Pfeiffer proves to be a very tasty Catwoman indeed." Entertainment Weeklys Owen Gleiberman wrote: "The runaway star here is Pfeiffer, whose performance is a sexy, comic triumph." Kenneth Turan of the Los Angeles Times praised Pfeiffer: "Michelle Pfeiffer’s stylish and funny performance as the frumpy Selina Kyle and her alter ego, the whip-cracking gender-bending Catwoman. The energy and pizazz Pfeiffer brings to the dual role is a pleasure."

Legacy 

With Warner Bros. moving on development for Batman Forever in June 1993 (a film which briefly referenced Catwoman in dialogue form), a Catwoman spin-off was announced. Michelle Pfeiffer was to reprise her role, with the character not to appear in Forever because of her own spin-off. Burton became attached as director, while producer Denise Di Novi and writer Daniel Waters also returned. In January 1994, Burton was unsure of his plans to direct Catwoman or an adaptation of "The Fall of the House of Usher".

On June 6, 1995, Waters turned in his Catwoman script to Warner Bros., the same day Batman Forever was released. Burton was still being courted to direct. Waters joked, "Turning it in the day Batman Forever opened may not have been my best logistical move, in that it's the celebration of the fun-for-the-whole-family Batman. Catwoman is definitely not a fun-for-the-whole-family script." In an August 1995 interview, Pfeiffer re-iterated her interest in the spin-off, but explained her priorities would be challenged as a mother and commitments to other projects.

In January 1999, writer John August pitched his script, where Selina Kyle leaves Gotham and goes to her home town of Lake City. The film labored in development hell for years, with Pfeiffer replaced by Ashley Judd. The film ended up becoming the critically panned Catwoman (2004), starring Halle Berry as Patience Phillips, with Pfeiffer's Selina Kyle represented with a photograph of her alongside other "Catwomen".

In a 2021 interview with Screen Rant, Pfeiffer stated that she would be interested in reprising the role in The Flash, but that "no one's asked me yet".

For her role as Catwoman in 2022's The Batman, Zoe Kravitz has stated that Pfeiffer was one of her inspirations for the character. She gained support from the latter, Berry and also Anne Hathaway from The Dark Knight Rises as well.

See also
 Bruce Wayne (1989 film series character)
 Oswald Cobblepot (Batman Returns)

References

External links
  https://veermag.com/2022/03/sweeney-selina-and-the-antiheroic-tim-burton-revolutionary Sweeney, Selina, and the Antiheroic Tim Butron Revolutionary
 

Catwoman in other media
Batman (1989 film series)
Batman live-action film characters
DC Comics female supervillains
Action film villains
Female film villains
Fictional whip users
Film characters introduced in 1992
Batman characters
Fictional secretaries
Fictional vigilantes
Fictional thieves
Fictional murderers
Characters created by Tim Burton
Film supervillains